Pope John XIV of Alexandria, was the 96th Pope of Alexandria and Patriarch of the See of St. Mark.

He joined the Paromeos Monastery in the Nitrian Desert before becoming a Pope.

16th-century Coptic Orthodox popes of Alexandria
1586 deaths